Idalia Anreus (1932 – January 3, 1998) was a Cuban actress who worked in both theatre and film. A self-taught actress, she began working in children's theatre through her younger sister, theatre actress Gladys Anreus. In the late 1960s and early 1970s she worked in the Teatro Estudio theatre group, and by the late 1970s she had moved on to the Teatro Politico Bertold Brecht group.

In 1968 she married film director Manuel Octavio Gómez; she would appear in leading roles in many of his films. Her first film was the 1966 La salación, a comedy directed by her future husband, where two of her sisters, Dinorah and Nereyda also acted. She appeared in eleven films between 1966 and 1983. Throat cancer forced her retirement from acting by the mid-1980s. She died of a heart attack when she was visiting her sisters in Elizabeth, New Jersey.

She won the award for Best Actress at the 7th Moscow International Film Festival for her role in Los dias del agua.

Filmography

References

External links

1932 births
1998 deaths
Cuban film actresses
People from Havana
20th-century Cuban actresses